Rocky Visconte (born 22 April 1990) is an Australian footballer who plays for Croydon Kings in the National Premier Leagues South Australia.

Club career

Croydon Kings
In 2005, he made his first senior appearance for local South Australian Premier League club Croydon Kings. He went on the make 10 appearances.

Hearts
On 19 September 2006 Visconte was signed by Heart of Midlothian on a three-year contract along with fellow Australian Ryan McGowan, after impressing then Hearts youth coach, Darren Murray, in a trial.

On 9 January 2010, he made his first team debut for Hearts against Aberdeen, as the starting left fullback in the fourth round of the Scottish Cup. Visconte then made his first appearance as a substitute in the 3–0 home defeat to Aberdeen. Visconte's first league debut came away to St Johnstone in Jim Jefferies first game back in charge.

Ayr United
On 3 February 2010, he was loaned out by Hearts to second division club, Ayr United, joining Ryan McGowan who was also on loan. The move was initiated to find regular game time.

Brisbane Roar
On 6 May 2010, after turning down a new Hearts contract, Visconte returned home to Australia to sign with A-League club Brisbane Roar. Visconte was given the number 14 for Brisbane. He scored 2 goals for the team in three seasons, playing 24 games, starting 7 and playing a total of 808 minutes. On 8 January 2013, Brisbane Roar announced that they had mutually agreed with Visconte to terminate his contract effective immediately.

Western Sydney Wanderers 
Following his mutual termination he began negotiations with Western Sydney Wanderers FC, joining the club on 9 January on a short-term contract. Visconte, along with teammates Tarek Elrich, Joey Gibbs and Dino Kresinger were released by the Wanderers at the conclusion of the 2012-13 A-League season.

Honors
With Brisbane Roar:
 A-League Premiership: 2010–11
 A-League Championship: 2010–11, 2011–12

With Western Sydney Wanderers:
 A-League Premiership: 2012–13

Personal life
On 9 April 2010, Visconte was robbed at knife-point by a gang of three men near Fountain Park in Edinburgh and was robbed of £300.

Honours
 Sergio Melta Award- South Australian First Division Best and Fairest: 2014

References

External links
 Brisbane Roar profile
 Rocky Visconte at Aussie Footballers
 FFA - Young Socceroos profile

Living people
1990 births
Croydon Kings players
Heart of Midlothian F.C. players
Ayr United F.C. players
Brisbane Roar FC players
Western Sydney Wanderers FC players
Rocky Visconte
Adelaide Raiders SC players
Scottish Premier League players
Scottish Football League players
Association football midfielders
Australian soccer players
Australian people of Italian descent
Australian expatriate sportspeople in Scotland
Australian expatriate sportspeople in Thailand
Soccer players from Adelaide
Expatriate footballers in Scotland
A-League Men players
Expatriate footballers in Thailand
National Premier Leagues players